Chris Palmer (born 4 October 1968) is a Canadian politician, who was elected to the Legislative Assembly of Prince Edward Island in a by-election on October 17, 2016. He represented the electoral district of Summerside-Wilmot as a member of the Prince Edward Island Liberal Party until his defeat in the 2019 Prince Edward Island general election.

On January 10, 2018, Palmer was appointed to the Executive Council of Prince Edward Island as Minister of Economic Development and Tourism.

Prior to his election to the legislature, Palmer was a business owner in Summerside, including as a property developer and owner of a pottery business.

Electoral record

References

Living people
People from Summerside, Prince Edward Island
Prince Edward Island Liberal Party MLAs
21st-century Canadian politicians
Members of the Executive Council of Prince Edward Island
1968 births